Nitta-Jo (born in Paris on October 8, 1881, or 1887) was the stage name for French singer and performer Jeanne Daflon, also known as Fannie Daflon or Jeanne Nitta Dufflin or Fanny Dafflan.

Personal life
She was the daughter of Philip Dafflon, general manager of the Le Bon Marché department store in Paris.
It was said that she made her stage debut at the age of 9, but another account states that as a child from Montmartre "she used to deliver hats from a shop on the Rue de la Paix on her bicycle[,] and when she grew up she became a salesgirl....A well known singing teacher became interested in her voice and gave her lessons and, in due course of time, she became a concert singer."

She was married around 1912 in Bucharest, Romania, to Charles E. Durnell, "an American horseman who was in charge of the racing stables of the Romanian Prime Minister." Durnell's nickname was "Boots," and he was a noted horse owner and trainer who "handled the entries of the Queen of Rumania for seven years." The couple lived in Romania until the country entered the Great War, then they relocated to Russia, where Durnell also raced horses.

They had one child, a boy, who was born in the United States shortly after they arrived. Charles E. "Boots" Durnell died February 16, 1949, in Arcadia, California.

Professional life

She performed as a gigolette and was known in French as La Gigolette Parisienne.

In Romania and Russia

In Romania, Nitta Jo was said to have made herself "a national heroine" with her jibes against government policies.

She rebuffed a government order to cease singing the French national song, La Marseillaise, while she was living there in 1916 because it was a violation of the nation's neutrality during wartime. "Did that gag Nitta Jo?" asked foreign correspondent Robert Mountsier in a column. 
"It did not. She immediately began singing a song, each verse of which set forth to the enjoyment of her audience the weak spots in Roumanian neutrality." Each verse ended with the words, sung to several bars of the French song, "La Marseillaise est défendue" (the Marseillaise is defended).

She left Romania during the war to go to Russia, "until the chaotic conditions there made any form of amusement impossible," according to an article in The Buffalo Enquirer, which continued: "The reign of terror of the Bolsheviks forced her after witnessing innumerable uprisings and massacres to escape through Siberia to Japan[,] where she sailed to America."

In Russia, she and her husband were "confined to their apartments for eight days during the revolutionary fighting," the Reno (Nevada) Evening Gazette reported after an interview. They arrived in the United States via China, Victoria, British Columbia, and San Francisco, California, where they stayed at the Palace Hotel.

In North America

In the United States, where she was publicized as a "character singer," she debuted at the Orpheum theater in New York City in 1919. She was well received.
Her first North American tour began with appearances at the Princess Theatre in Montreal, Quebec, in September 1918. A writer in The Gazette praised her "natural elfishness and grotesquerie of person and manner." In October she moved on to New York City, where the Herald said she was "a real 'find' for vaudeville." She also appeared in Buffalo; the Evening News said she "has created a furore and has been acclaimed the greatest artiste imported in years,"  and in Rochester. She ended the 1919 tour in Washington, D.C.

In April 1920, she sang at the Orpheum Theater in San Francisco, and the next month she was at the Orpheum in Los Angeles. Argonaut critic Josephine Hart Phelps said of her: "She fairly flashed temperament, and her whole being became a happy exuberance of rhythm." She and her husband were said to "have a beautiful home in France, to which they will return at the close of Nita-Jo's present engagement."

Her tracks are lost after a tour in Aix-en-Provence in 1938.

Filmography
Cendrillon de Paris (1930), as La Diseuse
The Fortune (1931 film) as Maryanne
Toine (1932), as Maud Florens (singer and love interest)
Paradis d'Afrique (African paradise)
Mon oncle de Marseille (My uncle from Marseille)

Discography
"Mon homme Les Baisers"
Cocaine"
"J'ai soif"
"Ta voix" (1930), from the film Cendrillon de Paris"
"Tango des roses" (1931)Mystérieuse Nitta-Jo (Chanteuses réalistes), album
"Sahara"

References

Additional reading

  "Nitta-Jô," dutempsdescerisesauxfeuillesmortes,'' biography, photos, video, audio (in French)

1880s births
French women singers
Year of death missing